The 1913 Wyoming Cowboys football team was an American football team that represented the University of Wyoming as a member of the Rocky Mountain Conference (RMC) during the 1913 college football season. In their first season under head coach Ralph Thacker, the Cowboys compiled a 0–5 record with all games against conference opponents, finishing last out of seven teams in the RMC. Wyoming failed to score a point and was outscored by a total of 183 to 0. Harry Rogers was the team captain.

Schedule

References

Wyoming
Wyoming Cowboys football seasons
College football winless seasons
Wyoming Cowboys football